The London Borough of Brent, an Outer London borough to the north west of the conurbation, has about 100 parks and open spaces within its boundaries. These include recreation and sports grounds, a large country park, and a large reservoir. The main areas of open space are:
 Barham Park, Sudbury: formal Victorian park, about 10.5 hectares 
 (open space around) Brent Reservoir ("Welsh Harp"): partly in Barnet, about 170 hectares, Local Nature Reserve and the borough's only Site of Special Scientific Interest
 Fryent Country Park including Barn Hill Wood, Kingsbury: about 103 hectares, Local Nature Reserve
 Gladstone Park, Dollis Hill: opened May 1901, formal park named after William Ewart Gladstone, about 35 hectares 
Northwick Park, Kenton/Harrow
Roe Green Park, Kingsbury
 Roundwood Park, Willesden: opened May 1895, formal Victorian park, about 10.27 hectares 
 Queen's Park, Kilburn, Victorian park, administered by the City of London
 Roe Green Park, first opened c. 1920, about 16.83 hectares.
Vale Farm Sports Ground, North Wembley
Woodcock Park, Kenton

References

External links
Brent parks and open spaces